Epigenetics of anxiety and stress–related disorders is the field studying the relationship between epigenetic modifications of genes and anxiety and stress-related disorders, including mental health disorders such as generalized anxiety disorder (GAD), post-traumatic stress disorder, obsessive-compulsive disorder (OCD), and more.

Epigenetic modifications play a role in the development and heritability of these disorders and related symptoms. For example, regulation of the hypothalamus-pituitary-adrenal axis by glucocorticoids plays a major role in stress response and is known to be epigenetically regulated.

As of 2015 most work has been done in animal models in laboratories, and little work has been done in humans; the work is not yet applicable to clinical psychiatry.

Epigenetic writers, erasers, and readers 
Epigenetic changes are performed by enzymes known as writers, which can add epigenetic modifications, erasers, which erase epigenetic modifications, and readers, which can recognize epigenetic modifications and cause a downstream effect. Stress-induced modifications of these writers, erasers, and readers result in important epigenetic modifications such as DNA methylation and acetylation.

DNA methylation 

DNA methylation is a type of epigenetic modification in which methyl groups are added to cytosines of DNA. DNA methylation is an important regulator of gene expression and is usually associated with gene repression.

MeCP2 
Laboratory studies have found that early life stress in rodents can cause phosphorylation of methyl CpG binding protein 2 (MeCP2), a protein that preferentially binds CpGs and is most often associated with suppression of gene expression. Stress-dependent phosphorylation of MeCP2 causes MeCP2 to dissociate from the promoter region of a gene called arginine vasopressin (avp), causing avp to become demethylated and upregulated. This may be significant because arginine vasopressin is known to regulate mood and cognitive behavior. Additionally, arginine vasopressin upregulates corticotropin-releasing hormone (CRH), which is a hormone important for stress response. Thus, stress-induced upregulation of avp due to demethylation might alter mood, behavior, and stress responses. Demethylation of this locus can be explained by reduced binding of DNA methyl transferases (DNMT), an enzyme that adds methyl groups to DNA, to this locus.

MeCP2 is known to have interactions with several other enzymes that modify chromatin (for example, HDAC-containing complexes and co-repressors) and in turn regulate activity of genes that modulate stress response either by increasing or decreasing stress tolerance. For example, epigenetic upregulation of genes that increase stress response may cause decreased stress tolerance in an organism. These interactions are dependent on the phosphorylation status of MeCP2, which as previously mentioned, can be altered by stress.

DNMT1 
DNA methyltransferase 1 (DNMT1) belongs to a family of proteins known as DNA methyltransferases, which are enzymes that add methyl groups to DNA. DNMT1 is specifically involved in maintaining DNA methylation; hence it is also known as the maintenance methylase DNMT1. DNMT1 aids in regulation of gene expression by methylating promoter regions of genes, causing transcriptional repression of these genes.

DNMT1 is transcriptionally repressed under stress-mimicking exposure both in vitro and in vivo using a mouse model. Accordingly, transcriptional repression of DNMT1 in response to long-term stress-mimicking exposure causes decreased DNA methylation, which is a marker of gene activation. In particular, there is decreased methylation of a gene called fkbp5, which plays a role in stress response as a glucocorticoid-responsive gene. Thus, chronic stress may cause demethylation and hyperactivation of a stress-related gene, causing increased stress response.

Additionally, DNMT1 gene locus has increased methylation in individuals who were exposed to trauma and developed post-traumatic stress disorder (PTSD). Increased methylation of DNMT1 did not occur in trauma-exposed individuals who did not develop PTSD. This may indicate an epigenetic phenotype that can differentiate PTSD-susceptible and PTSD-resilient individuals after exposure to trauma.

Transcription factors 
Transcription factors are proteins that bind DNA and modulate the transcription of genes into RNA such as mRNA, tRNA, rRNA, and more; thus they are essential components of gene activation. Stress and trauma can affect expression of transcription factors, which in turn alter DNA methylation patterns.

For example, transcription factor nerve growth-induced protein A (NGFI-A, also called NAB1) is up-regulated in response to high maternal care in rodents, and down-regulated in response to low maternal care (a form of early life stress). Decreased NGFI-A due to low maternal care increases methylation of a glucocorticoid receptor promoter in rats. Glucocorticoid is known to play a role in downregulating stress response; therefore, downregulation of glucocorticoid receptor by methylation causes increased sensitivity to stress.

Histone acetylation 

Histone acetylation and deacetylation is a type of epigenetic modification in which acetyl groups are added to lysine on histone tails. Histone acetylation, performed by enzymes known as histone acetyltransferases (HATs), removes the positive charge from lysine and results in gene activation by weakening the histone's interaction with negatively-charged DNA. In contrast, histone deacetylation performed by histone deacetylases (HDACs) results in gene deactivation.

HDAC 
Transcriptional activity and expression of HDACs is altered in response to early life stress. For animals exposed to early life stress, HDAC expression tends to be lower when they are young and higher when they are older. This suggests an age-dependent effect of early life stress on HDAC expression. These HDACs may result in deacetylation and thus activation of genes that upregulate stress response and decrease stress tolerance.

Transgenerational epigenetic influences 

Genome-wide association studies have shown that psychiatric disorders are partly heritable; however, heritability cannot be fully explained by classical Mendelian genetics. Epigenetics has been postulated to play a role. This is because there is strong evidence of transgenerational epigenetic effects in general. For example, one study found transmission of DNA methylation patterns from fathers to offspring during spermatogenesis. More specifically to mental illnesses, several studies have shown that traits of psychiatric illnesses (such as traits of PTSD and other anxiety disorders) can be transmitted epigenetically. Parental exposure to various stimuli, both positive and negative, can cause these transgenerational epigenetic and behavioral effects.

Parental exposure to trauma and stress 
Trauma and stress experienced by a parent can cause epigenetic changes to its offspring. This has been observed both in population and experimental studies.

Holocaust 
An epidemiological study investigating behavioral, physiological, and molecular changes in the children of Holocaust survivors found epigenetic modifications of a glucocorticoid receptor gene, Nr3c1. This is significant because glucocorticoid is a regulator of the hypothalamus-pituitary-adrenal axis (HPA) and is known to affect stress response. These stress-related epigenetic changes were accompanied by other characteristics that indicated higher stress and anxiety in these offspring, including increased symptoms of PTSD, greater risk of anxiety, and higher levels of the stress hormone cortisol.

Experimental evidence 
The effect of parental exposure to stress has been tested experimentally as well. For example, male mice who were put under early life stress through poor maternal care—a scenario analogous to human childhood trauma—passed on epigenetic changes that resulted in behavioral changes in offspring. Offspring experienced altered DNA methylation of stress-response genes such as CB1 and CRF2 in the cortex, as well as epigenetic alterations in transcriptional regulation gene MeCP2. Offspring were also more sensitive to stress, which is in accordance with the altered epigenetic profile. These changes persisted for up to three generations.

In another example, male mice were socially isolated as a form of stress. Offspring of these mice had increased anxiety in response to stressful conditions, increased stress hormone levels, dysregulation of the HPA axis which plays a key role in stress response, and several other characteristics that indicated increased sensitivity to stress.

Inheritance of small-noncoding RNA 
Studies have found that early life stress induced through poor maternal care alters sperm epigenome in male mice. In particular, expression patterns of small-noncoding RNAs (sncRNAs) are altered in the sperm, as well as in stress-related regions of the brain. Offspring of these mice exhibited the same sncRNA expression changes in the brain, but not in the sperm. These changes were coupled with behavioral changes in the offspring that were comparable to behavior of the stressed fathers, especially in terms of stress response. Additionally, when the sncRNAs in the fathers' sperm were isolated and injected into fertilized eggs, the resulting offspring inherited the stress behavior of the father. This suggests that stress-induced modifications of sncRNAs in sperm can cause inheritance of stress phenotype independent of the father's DNA.

Parental exposure to positive stimulation

Exercise 
Just as parental stress can alter epigenetics of offspring, parental exposure to positive environmental factors cause epigenetic modifications as well. For example, male mice that participated in voluntary physical exercise resulted in offspring that had reduced fear memory and anxiety-like behavior in response to stress. This behavioral change likely occurred due to expressions of small non-coding RNAs that were altered in sperm cells of the fathers.

Stress effect reversal 
Additionally, exposing fathers to enriching environments can reverse the effect of early life stress on their offspring. When early life stress is followed by environmental enrichment, anxiety-like behavior in offspring is prevented. Similar studies have been conducted in humans and suggest that DNA methylation plays a role.

Post-traumatic stress disorder (PTSD) 
Post-traumatic stress disorder (PTSD) is a stress-related mental health disorder that emerges in response to traumatic or highly stressful experiences. It is believed that PTSD develops as a result of an interaction between these traumatic experiences and genetic factors. The signs and symptoms of PTSD can include avoidance behaviors, invasive thoughts, and significant alterations in normal behavior and thinking. There is evidence suggesting PTSD formation is associated with epigenetic changes such as DNA methylation and acetylation of histone proteins. Increased DNA methylation has been found to regulate the induction of fear conditioning behaviors associated with PTSD triggers. Histone modifications, like acetylation and deacetylation, play an important role in the development of PTSD, which is related to fear memory from traumatic events.

The DSM-5 asserts that PTSD manifests differently in children over six years old than in adults. Specifically that their flashbacks and/or intrusive memories may be explained by recreating their traumatic event(s) through their play. They may also experience reoccurring nightmares that are indirectly related to the event. Additionally, there is a separate criteria altogether for PTSD in children under six years old.

Epigenetic Modifications

DNA methylation 
Through a number of human studies, PTSD is known to affect DNA methylation of CpG islands in several genes involved in numerous activities, including stress responses and neurotransmitter activity. CpGs are used to describe cytosine-guanine adjacent nucleotides within the same strand of DNA. CpG islands are defined by computer algorithms as being made up of at least 60% CpGs and being anywhere between 200 and 3000 base pairs in size. The methylation of these CpG islands can cause histone modifications which can lead to the condensation of chromatin which can ultimately alter gene expression.

DNMT Enzyme 
DNA methyltransferase, DNMT, is an enzyme responsible for increased methylation of DNA. It has been found that DNMT and its associated increased methylation can regulate risk for memory consolidation and fear conditioning.

TET Enzyme 
The removal of methyl groups from cytosine is initiated by a TET enzyme. TET is an enzyme known to oxidize 5-methylcytosine (5mC) to 5-hydroxymethylcytosine (5hmC) within the genome. This reaction initiates active DNA demethylation to ultimately alter gene expression. It has been found that the TET enzyme exists as two isoforms which are differentially regulated and expressed across brain regions. The regulation of these isoforms can affect synaptic connections and ultimately memory formation. The manipulation of the TET enzymes' expression levels has become a potential source of interest for PTSD medication.

The table below identifies differentially methylated regions (DMRs) across the genome which undergo PTSD-induced epigenetic changes which alter gene expression.

Histone Modifications 
Histone acetylation is performed by histone acetyl transferases (HATs) and histone deacetylation is carried out by histone deacetylases (HDACs). In rodent PTSD models, it has been found that an increase in histone acetylation is associated with fear conditioning. Histone acetylation can be involved in all parts of fear memory, including the development to memory extinction. It can also play a role in long-term potentiation (LTP). It was also observed that HDACs increase memory formation in fear extinction and HDAC inhibitors (HDACi) have shown evidence for modifying memory extinction, a possible treatment for PTSD.

Nervous System Structures Affected by PTSD

Hypothalamus-pituitary-adrenal axis 
The hypothalamus-pituitary-adrenal (HPA) axis is a neuroendocrine system largely involved in ascertaining the levels of cortisol circulating the body at any given point in time. As cortisol plays a key role in the stress response, so does the HPA axis. The dysregulation of the HPA axis has been found to be characteristic of several stress disorders, including PTSD. This system works under a negative feedback loop structure. Hence, this HPA axis dysregulation may take the form of amplified negative inhibition and result in down-regulated cortisol levels. Epigenetic modifications play a role in this dysregulation, and these modifications are likely caused by the traumatic/stressful experience that triggered PTSD.

Immune dysregulation by HPA Axis Modifications 
PTSD is often linked with immune dysregulation. Traumatic experiences can induce epigenetic changes at the gene loci that are immune-related which can lead to immune dysregulation and an increased risk of PTSD. Trauma exposure can also disrupt the HPA axis, thus altering peripheral immune function. The effect of PTSD on immune function arises in at least two ways: 1) Continuous disturbances on the HPA axis can dysregulate peripheral immune function, and 2) the effects of immune dysregulation in the periphery can lead to increased development of PTSD because of alterations in brain function.

PTSD-associated changes in immune cells found in blood or saliva can serve as biomarkers that trigger epigenetic changes which are involved in the pathogenesis of PTSD. These unique biomarkers serve as means of identifying PTSD subtypes. Beyond identifying subtypes, these distinct biomarkers can potentially be used to develop PTSD treatments.

Epigenetic modifications have been observed in immune-related genes of individuals with PTSD. For example, deployed military members who developed PTSD have higher methylation in the immune-related gene interleukin-18 (IL-18). This has interested scientists because high levels of IL-18 increase cardiovascular disease risk, and individuals with PTSD have elevated cardiovascular disease risk. Thus, stress-induced immune dysregulation via methylation of IL-18 may play a role in cardiovascular disease in individuals with PTSD.

Additionally, an epigenome-wide study found that individuals with PTSD have altered levels of methylation in the following immune-related genes: TPR, CLEC9A, APC5, ANXA2, TLR8, IL-4, and IL-2. This again shows that immune function in PTSD is disrupted, especially by epigenetic changes that are likely stress-induced.

Genes Affected by PTSD

NR3C1 
Nr3c1 is a transcription factor that encodes a glucocorticoid receptor (GR) and contains many GR response elements. Npas4 is another regulatory transcription factor also responsible for the regulation of GRs. Stress-induced changes in Nr3c1 and Npas4 methylation have been shown to alter stress sensitivity. This response differs between short-lived stress exposure and chronic stress exposure. In response to short lived stress, the NR3C1 promoter is more hydroxymethylated which is a modification associated with increased transcription of GR-associated genes. Thus, short lived stress exposure increases stress sensitivity. Conversely, in response to chronic stress, the Npas4 promoter has been presumed to be increased in methylation, a modification which is associated with inhibitory regulation of GRs. Thus, chronic stress exposure decreases stress sensitivity. These distinctions are important in understanding the epigenetic patterns of stress and genetic interactions with PTSD triggers. Overall, in the hippocampus of chronically stressed animals, the 3′-UTR (untranslated region of DNA) of the glucocorticoid receptor Nr3c1 showed increased hydroxymethylation, which led to increased transcription and thus, the disruption of stress tolerance and increased risk of disorders such as PTSD. However, early life stress increases methylation of the 1F promoter in this gene (or the 17 promoter analog in rodents). Because of its role in stress response and its link to early life stress, this gene has been of particular interest in the context of PTSD and has been studied in PTSD of both combat veterans and civilians.

In studies involving combat veterans, those who developed PTSD had lowered methylation of the Nr3c1 1F promoter compared to those who did not develop PTSD. Additionally, veterans who developed PTSD and had higher Nr3c1 promoter methylation responded better to long-term psychotherapy compared to veterans with PTSD who had lower methylation. These findings were recapitulated in studies involving civilians with PTSD. In civilians, PTSD is linked to lower methylation levels in the T-cells of exons 1B and 1C of Nr3c1, as well as higher GR expression. Thus, it seems that PTSD causes lowered methylation levels of GR loci and increased GR expression. The methylation of GR in T-cells are investigated because of its role in regulating cell immunity which, as such, stores cellular memory with environmental factors. T-cell fragments from individual cell populations are preferred over homogenized tissue because of the drastic variation in DNA methylation patterns between different cell fragments.

Although these results of decreased methylation and hyperactivation of GR conflict with the effect of early life stress at the same loci, these results match previous findings that distinguish HPA activity in early life stress versus PTSD. For example, cortisol levels of HPA in response to early life stress is hyperactive, whereas it is hypoactive in PTSD. Thus, the timing of trauma and stress—whether early or later in life—can cause differing effects on HPA and GR.

FKBP5 
Fkbp5 encodes a GR-responsive protein known as Fk506 binding protein 51 (FKBP5). FKBP5 is induced by GR activation and functions in negative feedback by binding GR and reducing GR signaling. There is particular interest in this gene because some FKBP5 alleles have been correlated with increased risk of PTSD and development of PTSD symptoms—especially in PTSD caused by early life adversity. Therefore, FKBP5 likely plays an important role in PTSD.

As mentioned previously, certain FKBP5 alleles are correlated to increase PTSD risk, especially due to early life trauma. It is now known that epigenetic regulation of these alleles is also an important factor. For example, CpG sites in intron 7 of FKBP5 are demethylated after exposure to childhood trauma, but not adult trauma. Additionally, methylation of FKBP5 is alters in response to PTSD treatment; thus methylation levels of FKBP5 might correspond to PTSD disease progression and recovery.

ADCYAP1 and ADCYAP1R1 
Pituitary adenylate cyclase-activating polypeptide (ADCYAP1) and its receptor (ADCYAP1R1) are stress responsive genes that play a role in modulating stress, among many other functions. Additionally, high levels of ADCYAP1 in peripheral blood is correlated to PTSD diagnosis in females who have experienced trauma, thus making ADCYAP1 a gene of interest in the context of PTSD.

Epigenetic regulation of these loci in relation to PTSD still require further investigation, but one study has found that high methylation levels of CpG islands in ADCYAP1R1 can predict PTSD symptoms in both males and females.

Alcohol use disorder 
Alcohol dependence and stress interact in many ways. For example, stress-related disorders such as anxiety and PTSD are known to increase risk of alcohol use disorder (AUD), and they are often co-morbid. This may in part be due to the fact that alcohol can alleviate some symptoms of these disorders, thus promoting dependence on alcohol. Conversely, early exposure to alcohol can increase vulnerability to stress and stress-related disorders. Moreover, alcohol dependence and stress are known to follow similar neuronal pathways, and these pathways are often dysregulated by similar epigenetic modifications.

Histone acetylation

HDAC 
Histone acetylation is dysregulated by alcohol exposure and dependence, often through dysregulated expression and activity of HDACs, which modulate histone acetylation by removing acetyl groups from lysines of histone tails. For example, HDAC expression is upregulated in chronic alcohol use models. Monocyte-derived dendritic cells of alcohol users have increased HDAC gene expression compared to non-users. These results are also supported by in vivo rat studies, which show that HDAC expression is higher in alcohol-dependent mice that in non-dependent mice. Furthermore, knockout of HDAC2 in mice helps lower alcohol dependence behaviors. The same pattern of HDAC expression is seen in alcohol withdrawal, but acute alcohol exposure has the opposite effect; in vivo, HDAC expression and histone acetylation markers are decreased in the amygdala.<ref name="Palmisano_2017" /

Dysregulation of HDACs is significant because it can cause upregulation or downregulation of genes that have important downstream effects both in alcohol dependence and anxiety-like behaviors, and the interaction between the two. A key example is BDNF (see "BDNF" below).

BDNF 
Brain-derived neurotrophic factor (BDNF) is a key protein that is dysregulated by HDAC dysregulation. BDNF is a protein that regulates the structure and function of neuronal synapses. It plays an important role in neuronal activation, synaptic plasticity, and dendritic morphology—all of which are factors that may affect cognitive function. Dysregulation of BDNF is seen both in stress-related disorders and alcoholism; thus BDNF is likely an important molecule in the interaction between stress and alcoholism.

For example, BDNF is dysregulated by acute ethanol exposure. Acute ethanol exposure causes phosphorylation of CREB, which can cause increased histone acetylation at BDNF loci. Histone acetylation upregulates BDNF, in turn upregulating a downstream BDNF target called activity-regulated cytoskeleton associated protein (Arc), which is a protein responsible for dendritic spine structure and formation. This is significant because activation of Arc can be associated with anxiolytic (anxiety-reducing) effects. Therefore, ethanol consumption can cause epigenetic changes that alleviate stress and anxiety, thereby creating a pattern of stress-induced alcohol dependence.

Alcohol dependence is exacerbated by ethanol withdrawal. This is because ethanol withdrawal has the opposite effect of ethanol exposure; it causes lowered CREB phosphorylation, lowered acetylation, downregulation of BDNF, and increase in anxiety. Consequently, ethanol withdrawal reinforces desire for anxiolytic effects of ethanol exposure. Moreover, it is proposed that chronic ethanol exposure results in upregulation of HDAC activity, causing anxiety-like effects that can no longer be alleviated by acute ethanol exposure.

Potential epigenetic drug treatments 

The most common treatments for anxiety disorders at the moment are benzodiazepines, Buspirone, and antidepresants. However, around one/third of patients with anxiety disorders do not respond well to the current anxiolytics, and many others have treatment-resistant anxiety disorders. Recent research surrounding DNA methylation changes in genes in genes encoding proteins associated with the HPA axis, histone modifications, and sncRNAs point to epigenetic drugs potentially being effective treatment methods for anxiety disorders.

HDACi
Histone deacetylase inhibitors (HDACi) fall into five different classes, not to be confused with the four different classes of HDACs. The five classes of HDACi consist of (I) hydroxamic acids, (II) short-chain fatty acids, (III) benzamides, (IV) cyclic tetrapeptides, and (V) sirtuin inhibitors. The three classes of HDACs are class I, consisting of HDAC1, HDAC2, HDAC3, HDAC8, class II, consisting of HDAC4, HDAC5, HDAC6, HDAC7, HDAC9, HDAC10, class III, consisting of NAD+-dependent HDACS, and class IV, consisting of HDAC11. While most HDACi inhibit only specific classes of HDACs, certain HDACi can act against all classes, making them pan-inhibitors.

HDACi are currently being researched as potential anxiolytics. At the moment, the mechanism of action of HDAC inhibitors in the treatment of anxiety disorders is not clear, as they affect several targets and have multiple pharmacological effects besides the inhibition of HDACs. However, they have been shown to cause DNA demethylation, possibly due to an increase in the levels of TET1, which is a demethylating enzyme. In the human peripheral cells of patients with anxiety disorders and in animal models of anxiety disorders, genes such as GAD1, NR3C1, BDNF, MAOA, HECA, and FKBP5 are shown to be hypermethylated. As such, the mechanism of action of HDACi in anxiety disorders could, in part, be potentially explained by the demethylation of those genes.

Valproate
Valproate is a drug that acts as an HDACi on class I and II HDACs. Six clinical trials surrounding its use as an anxiolytic have been performed so far. Five of the six trials were performed on patients with anxiety disorders, and one of the trials used healthy subjects with no anxiety disorders. Of the five trials performed on patients with anxiety disorders, three found that Valproate decreases panic disorder, one found that Valproate decreases social anxiety, and one found that Valproate reduces generalized anxiety. The trial performed on healthy subjects found that Valproate reduces anxiety and also acts as a nerve conduction inhibitor, which could be an explanation for some of its anxiety-reducing effects.

D-cycloserine, Trichostatin-a, Suberoylanilide hydroxamic acid, sodium butyrate, and valproic acid
Various preclinical drug trials using other HDAC inhibitors have also been performed, with most drugs targeting HDAC classes I and II and a select few targeting classes IV and III. The HDACi drug, d-cycloserine, was found to reduce fear in 129S1/SvImJ mice, which are mice that show poor extinction acquisition and recovery of fear-induced suppression of heart-rate variability, enlarged dendritic arbors in basolateral amygdala neurons, and functional abnormalities in cortico-amygdala circuitry that mediates fear extinction. Trichostatin-a was normalized BDNF and Arc expression in the central and the medial nucleus of the amygdala in rats experiencing alcohol withdrawal. Suberoylanilide hydroxamic acid significantly reversed anxiety-like behaviors and stress-induced gastrointestinal hypersensitivity and fecal pellet output. Anxiety-like and depression-like behaviors caused by immobilization stress and/or nicotine addiction were also reduced in mice treated with the HDACi sodium butyrate and valproic acid.

Lactate
Lactate, a metabolite that is naturally produced during exercise, was found to function as an HDAC II and III modulator in a pre-clinical trial. The trial was performed on C57BL/6 mice, which are mice that were exposed to chronic stress in the form of daily defeat by a CD-1 aggressive mouse. While control mice exhibited increased social avoidance, anxiety, and susceptibility to depression, mice that received lactate before each defeat demonstrated resilience to depression and stress and reduced social avoidance and anxiety. Lactate promoted this resilience by restoring regular hippocampal class I HDAC levels and activity.

sncRNA
Preliminary research has been done about therapy involving small non-coding RNAs, demonstrating that they can regulate epigenetic mechanisms of gene expression and could present as biomarkers for disease. One therapy option is for the sncRNAs in patients with anxiety disorders to be targeted for upregulation. Another option is to inhibit the miRNAs in order to reduce their effects, potentially using antisense oligonucleotides or antagomirs as inhibitors.

Hydrocortisone 
The medication hydrocortisone is a synthetic form of cortisol. In recent years, the administration of hydrocortisone has been tested as a possible preventative measure for the onset of PTSD symptoms. Ideally, it should be administered immediately after a traumatic event. The efficacy of hydrocortisone as a preventative intervention for PTSD has been confirmed by a meta-analysis of eight separate studies, and researchers believe the best results are obtained when hydrocortisone is administered within the first six hours of exposure to the traumatic event. At this time, however, no curative properties have been discovered. Hydrocortisone's potential operates on two bases: restoration of normal HPA axis functioning and interference with memory consolidation.

HPA Axis Homeostasis 
Our standard understandings of PTSD may suggest elevated glucocorticoid levels during and directly following events of trauma. However, multiple studies have indicated that overall HPA axis activity and cortisol levels are depleted in the critical aftermath and extended period after trauma. Moreover, research has also indicated that an appropriate release of glucocorticoids following acute stress may restore homeostatic equilibrium of the HPA axis, thereby preventing gradual sensitization, which is responsible for persistent cortisol reduction and increased PTSD susceptibility. Thus, the appropriately-dosed administration of hydrocortisone promptly following the traumatic incident would normalize the HPA axis and potentially prevent PTSD onset.

Disruption of Memory Consolidation 
In the absence of memory reactivation, hydrocortisone's effectiveness within a six-hour window supports the consolidation theory, which asserts that memory is labile even immediately after trauma. It is assumed that the medication is disrupting initial memory consolidation of the traumatic event. However, its exact mechanism within this context remains largely unknown.

Although trials have proven promising, there is much more research to be done. Further comprehensive studies are required amidst more diverse populations under different traumatic conditions in order to ascertain factors of optimal usage of the drug and clarify the PTSD subgroups hydrocortisone is beneficial to.

Rodent Models Used to Study PTSD Medication

Stress-enhanced fear learning (SEFL) 
The observation of epigenetic modifications and their role in regulating fear learning is an active area of research. The use of stress-enhanced fear learning (SEFL) paradigms are important for forming preclinical models of PTSD because one is able to observe the epigenetic changes in rodents and PTSD associated changes in fear learning after stress exposure.

Single-prolonged stress (SPS) 
The single-prolonged stress (SPS) model is a tool in which a complex stressor is consistently presented. This tool is used to explore the complexity of PTSD, particularly its impaired fear extinction.

Susceptible Factors to PTSD 
Despite high levels of individuals exposed to trauma, only about one third of exposed individuals develop PTSD. This suggest that individuals differ in their susceptibility to PTSD. This might arise from differences in the epigenetic modifications that they generate in response to traumatic experiences. Furthermore, a large area of research regarding increased susceptibility to PTSD investigates the transgenerational inheritance of epigenetic modifications resulting from trauma. A recent review of PTSD susceptibility suggested that a range as wide as 30% to 70% of susceptibility to PTSD can be attributed to heritability. From our observations of mice in transgenerational research, we have seen that the epigenetic modifications that stem from trauma can be passed down multiple generations. Epigenetic modifications due trauma are not the only heritable factors that affect PTSD susceptibility. General histories of health deficiencies, both physical and psychological, have also been associated with a higher PTSD susceptibility. Sociodemographic factors may come into play as well. Particularly, ethnic minorities and women are more susceptible to development of PTSD.

See also 
 Behavioral epigenetics
 Transgenerational trauma
 Transgenerational epigenetic inheritance

References

Further reading 

 
 
 
 
 

Epigenetics
Anxiety disorders
Stress (biology)